Holywell Row is a village in Suffolk, England. It is part of the civil parish of Beck Row, Holywell Row and Kenny Hill. In 2018 it had an estimated population of 570.

References

Villages in Suffolk
Forest Heath